Visibility, in meteorology, is a measure of the distance at which an object or light can be seen.

Visibility may also refer to:
 A measure of turbidity in water quality control
 Interferometric visibility, which quantifies interference contrast in optics
 The reach of information hiding, in computing
 Visibility (geometry), a geometric abstraction of real-life visibility
 Visible spectrum, the portion of the electromagnetic spectrum that is visible to the human eye
 Visual perception
 Naked-eye visibility

Visible may also refer to:
 Visible (album), a 1985 album by CANO
 Visible: Out on Television, a 2020 miniseries from Apple TV+, about LGBTQ+ representation in TV
 Visible spectrum, light which can be seen by the human eye
 Visible (wireless service), an offshoot phone service from Verizon Communications

See also
 
 
 Transparency (disambiguation)
 Vis (disambiguation)
 Vision (disambiguation)